Omala is a former community on the island of Kefalonia, Ionian Islands, Greece. Since the 2019 local government reform it is part of the municipality Argostoli, of which it is a municipal unit. It is located in the south-central part of the island. Its land area is 46.699 km² and its population was 840 inhabitants at the 2011 census. The seat of the community was Valsamata, the only significant town (pop. 763). Its next largest settlements are Epanochori (33), and Michata (25).

References

Populated places in Cephalonia